Serfdom in Poland became the dominant form of relationship between peasants and nobility in the 17th century, and was a major feature of the economy of the Polish–Lithuanian Commonwealth, although its origins can be traced back to the 12th century.

The first steps towards abolishing of serfdom were enacted in the Constitution of 3 May 1791, and it was essentially eliminated by the Połaniec Manifesto. However, these reforms were nullified partly by partition of Poland. Frederick the Great had abolished serfdom in his territories gained from the first partition of Poland. Over the course of the 19th century, it was gradually abolished on Polish and Lithuanian territories under foreign control, as the region began to industrialize.

10th to 14th centuries
In the early days of the Kingdom of Poland under the Piast Dynasty in the 10th and 11th centuries, the social class of peasantry was among the several classes that developed. The peasants had the right to migrate, to own land, and were entitled to certain forms of judicial recourse in exchange for specific obligations toward their feudal lords.

Over time, more peasants became dependent on feudal lords. This occurred in various ways; the granting of lands together with their inhabitants to a lord by the king, debt bondage, and peasants subjecting themselves to a local lord in exchange for protection. There were several groups of peasants who had varying levels of rights, and their status changed over time, gradually degrading from a yeoman-like status to full serfdom. Conversely, the least privileged class of the bondsmen, the niewolni or outright slaves (formed primarily from prisoners-of-war), gradually disappeared over the same period.  By the late 12th century, peasantry could be divided into the free peasants (wolni or liberi), with the right to leave and relocate, and bonded subjects (poddani or obnoxii), without the right to leave. All peasants who held land from a feudal lord had to perform services or deliver goods to their lord. In time, and with the development of currency, most of those services evolved into payment of monetary rent, which became the dominant form of service around the 14th and 15th centuries.

15th to 18th centuries
Around 14th and 15th centuries, the right to leave the land became increasingly restricted, and peasants became tied to the land. Proper serfdom evolved in Poland together with the development of noble (szlachta) manorial estates known as folwarks, and with the export-driven grain trade (so-called Polish or Baltic grain trade) economy. According to historian Edward Corwin the year 1496 (Statutes of Piotrków) marks the proper beginning of the serfdom era in Poland. Likewise, Paul Robert Magosci points to a series of related legislation around the turn of the 15th and 16th centuries.

It was tied with the decrease in monetary rent, replaced by physical labor, demands for which increased over time. Whereas in the early days of serfdom in Poland, the peasant might have been required to farm less than three weeks in a year for his lord, in the 16th century, a weekly service of 1–2 man-days become common, and in the 18th century, almost all of a peasant's time could have been requested by the lord, in extreme cases requiring a peasant to labor eight man-days a week per 1 łan of land farmed by a peasants family for their own needs (the land belonged to the landlord), which in practice meant that the male head of the family worked full-time for the lord, leaving his wife and children working on the peasant's family land, and even then they had to help him occasionally, unless a peasant hired additional workers (poorer peasants). Simultaneously, peasantry rights (to own land, to leave it, or to have independent, royal justice) were reduced. 1521 marked the end of the peasant right to complain to the royal court. By the mid-16th century no peasant could leave the land without explicit permission of the lord. The situation of individuals who did not own land also worsened (migrant peasant workers), as several laws attempted to force them to become peasants (serfs). They were also forced to partake in various monopolies of their local lords (such as to buy drinks only in the tavern owned by the lord, or use only the lord's owned mills). Due to increased population, and impact of certain laws, individual peasant estates became steadily smaller. This resulted, particularly from the second half of the 16th century, in increased impoverishment of the peasantry, banditry and the occasional peasant uprising. This phenomenon was also witnessed in several other Central and Eastern European countries, and was known as the "second serfdom" or "neo-serfdom".

Reversal of those trends begun in the 18th century, as part of various reforms aiming the revitalize the ailing governance and economy of the Polish–Lithuanian Commonwealth. Some serfs became emancipated by their owners, who replaced the physical labor rent with monetary one. It became illegal for a lord to murder a serf, and the peasants regained some right to land ownership. 

As the situation of Polish serfs improved, it actually caused a problem in the Polish-Russian relations. Russian peasants were escaping from Russia to the Polish–Lithuanian Commonwealth in significant enough numbers to become a major concern for the Russian Government. Increasingly in the 18th century, Russian armies raided territories of the Commonwealth, officially to recover the escapees, but in fact kidnapping many locals. Describing the system as it existed by the end of the century, Wagner writes: "The situation of the peasants in Poland was better than in most other countries. In France and Germany, for example, the owners of landed estates had unlimited jurisdiction over them, including the power to punish by death. In Russia, their economic oppression was notorious, and one of the reasons Catherine II gave for the partition of Poland was the fact that thousands of peasants escaped from Russia to Poland to seek a better fate." Piotr Kimla noted that the Russian government spread international propaganda, mainly in France, which falsely exaggerated serfdom conditions in Poland, while ignoring worse conditions in Russia, as one of the justification for the partitions. 

Polish government reforms aiming at improving the situation of the peasantry reached culmination with the Constitution of 3 May 1791, which declared that the government would protect the peasantry, and encourage the use of contracts between peasants and their lords. Any further reforms were made impossible by the partitions of Poland and the resulting disappearance of the Polish state.

Abolition

Abolition of serfdom in Poland occurred gradually. At the end of the 18th century a great reform of the Polish state was carried out. Frederick the Great having gained a significant amount of land in the first partition of Poland, proceeded to introduce reforms in them which also included abolition of serfdom.

The Constitution of 3 May 1791 took the peasant class under the protection of the state, as the first step towards elimination serfdom. The Constitution was later overthrown by Polish magnates supported by Russia. Full abolishment was enacted by the Proclamation of Połaniec (1794) but this was also short-lived as Poland's neighbors invaded and partitioned the country in the third partition of 1795. In the 19th century, various reforms took place at different paces in the Austrian partition, Prussian partition and the Russian partition with the advent of industrial revolution. Serfdom was abolished in Prussia in 1807, in Austria in 1848, in Russia in 1861, and in Congress Kingdom of Poland in 1864.

See also
Agriculture in Poland
Baltic grain trade
Domar serfdom model
Economy of the Polish–Lithuanian Commonwealth
Proclamation of Połaniec
Slavery in Lithuania

References

Further reading
A. Kamiński, "Neo-Serfdom in Poland–Lithuania," Slavic Review 34:2 (1975): 253~268 JSTOR
Piotr Gorecki, "Viator to Ascriptititus: Rural Economy, Lordship, and the Origins of Serfdom in Medieval Poland.", Slavic Review, Vol. 42, No. 1  (Spring, 1983), pp. 14–35 JSTOR

External links
Clothing of Polish peasants throughout history

Poland
Economic history of Poland
Serfdom